The 2017 season is Seinäjoen Jalkapallokerho's 10th competitive season, and fourth in the Veikkausliiga. After finishing 3rd in the 2016 Veikkausliiga season, SJK entered the 2017–18 UEFA Europa League first qualifying round.

Season Review

Squad

Transfers

Winter

In:

Out:

Summer

In:

Out:

Competitions

Veikkausliiga

League table

Results summary

Results by matchday

Results

Finnish Cup

Sixth Round

Knockout stage

UEFA Europa League

Qualifying rounds

Squad statistics

Appearances and goals

|-
|colspan="14"|Players from Kerho 07 who appeared:

|-
|colspan="14"|Players away from the club on loan:
|-
|colspan="14"|Players who left SJK during the season:

|}

Goal scorers

Clean sheets

Disciplinary record

References

2017
SJK